The 2017–18 Isle of Man League was the 109th season of the Isle of Man Football League on the Isle of Man.  St Georges were the defending champion, having won the championship the previous season.

Promotion and relegation following the 2016–17 season

From the Premier League 
 Relegated to Division 2
 Ayre United
 Union Mills

From Division Two 
 Promoted to the Premier League
 Braddan
 Douglas Royal

Premier League

Teams

League table

Division Two

Teams

League table

References 

Isle of Man Football League seasons
Man
Foot
Foot